Hu Fuming (July 1935 – 2 January 2023) was a Chinese scholar and politician.

Biography
In September 1955, he studied journalism at Peking University. In 1956, he entered the Philosophy Research Class of Renmin University of China. After graduating in 1962, he taught at the Political Department of Nanjing University (later renamed the Department of Philosophy).

On 11 May 1978, his essay article Practice is the Sole Criterion for Testing Truth was published and was revised several times. This publication was noteworthy in connection to the Boluan Fanzheng era.

In November 1982, Fuming became the Deputy Minister of the Propaganda Department of the CPC Jiangsu Provincial Committee, before being appointed Minister in 1985.

In 1987 he became vice chairman of the Jiangsu Provincial Committee of the Chinese People's Political Consultative Conference.

On 18 December 2018, he was awarded the title of Pioneer of Reform.

Fuming died on 2 January 2023, at the age of 87, from COVID-19.

References

1935 births
2023 deaths
Chinese scholars
Chinese politicians
Place of death missing
People from Chongqing
Peking University alumni
Academic staff of Nanjing University
Deaths from the COVID-19 pandemic in China